The 1928–29 Illinois Fighting Illini men's basketball team represented the University of Illinois.

Regular season
The 1928-29 season was head coach Craig Ruby's seventh at the University of Illinois. With three returning starters from a team that finished in a ninth place tie in the Big Ten the year before, the Fighting Illini improved to an overall record of 10 wins and 7 losses and a conference record of 6 wins 6 losses. The starting lineup included captain Ernest F. Dorn at center, Charles Harper and Earl H. Drew at forward, and future head coach Douglas R. Mills and Herbert Hill at guard.

Roster

Source

Schedule

|-	
!colspan=12 style="background:#DF4E38; color:white;"| Non-Conference regular season
|- align="center" bgcolor=""

|-	
!colspan=9 style="background:#DF4E38; color:#FFFFFF;"|Big Ten regular season

Bold Italic connotes conference game
												
Source

Awards and honors

References

Illinois Fighting Illini
Illinois Fighting Illini men's basketball seasons
Illinois Fighting Illini
Illinois Fighting Illini